A sect is a subgroup of a religious, political, or philosophical belief system, usually an offshoot of a larger group. Although the term was originally a classification for religious separated groups, it can now refer to any organization that breaks away from a larger one to follow a different set of rules and principles. Sects are usually created due to perception of heresy by the subgroup and/or the larger group.

In an Indian context, sect refers to an organized tradition.

Etymology

The word sect comes from the Latin noun secta (a feminine form of a variant past participle of the verb sequi, to follow) meaning "a way, road". Figuratively, sect refers to a (prescribed) way, mode, or manner. Metonymously, sect refers to a discipline or school of thought as defined by a set of methods and doctrines. The many disparate usages of the word sect in modern times is largely due to confusion with the homonymous (but etymologically unrelated) Latin word secta (the feminine form of the past participle of the verb secare, to cut).

Sociological definitions and descriptions

There are several different sociological definitions and descriptions for the term. Among the first to define them were Max Weber and Ernst Troeltsch (1912). In the church-sect typology, sects are defined as voluntary associations of religiously qualified persons: membership is not ascribed at birth but results from the free acceptance of the sect's doctrine and discipline by the follower, and from the continuous acceptance of the follower by the sect. Sects tend to draw disproportionately from the underprivileged elements of society, and are usually created by schisms within churches, which are aligned with the dominant social structure. They are often decrying liberal trends in denominational development and advocating a return to true religion; their beliefs and practices tend to be more radical and ethically stern than those of churches, and constitute an act of protest against the values of the rest of society. The American sociologists Rodney Stark and William Sims Bainbridge assert that "sects claim to be authentic purged, refurbished version of the faith from which they split". They further assert that sects have, in contrast to churches, a high degree of tension with the surrounding society. Other sociologists of religion such as Fred Kniss have asserted that sectarianism is best described with regard to what a sect is in tension with. Some religious groups exist in tension only with co-religious groups of different ethnicities, or exist in tension with the whole of society rather than the church which the sect originated from.

Sectarianism is sometimes defined in the sociology of religion as a worldview that emphasizes the unique legitimacy of believers' creed and practices and that heightens tension with the larger society by engaging in boundary-maintaining practices.

In his book The Road to Total Freedom, the English sociologist Roy Wallis argues that a sect is characterized by "epistemological authoritarianism": sects possess some authoritative locus for the legitimate attribution of heresy. According to Wallis, "sects lay a claim to possess unique and privileged access to the truth or salvation" and "their committed adherents typically regard all those outside the confines of the collectivity as 'in error'". He contrasts this with a cult that he described as characterized by "epistemological individualism" by which he means that "the cult has no clear locus of final authority beyond the individual member."

In other languages
The corresponding words for "sect" in European languages other than English – Sekte (German), secte (French), secta (Spanish, Catalan), sectă (Romanian), setta (Italian),  seita (Portuguese, Galician), sekta (Polish, Czech, Slovak, Bosnian, Croatian, Serbian, Slovenian, Latvian, Lithuanian), sekt (Danish, Estonian, Norwegian, Swedish), sekte (Dutch), szekta (Hungarian), секта (Russian, Serbian, Bulgarian, Ukrainian), σέχτα (Greek) – refer to a harmful religious sect and translate into English as "cult".

In Buddhism

The Macmillan Encyclopedia of Religion distinguishes three types of classification of Buddhism, separated into "Movements", "Nikāyas" and "Doctrinal schools":

 Schools:
 Theravada, primarily in South Asia and Southeast Asia;
 Mahāyāna, primarily in East Asia;
 Vajrayāna, primarily in Tibet, Bhutan, Nepal, India, Mongolia and the Russian republic of Kalmykia.
 Nikāyas, or monastic fraternities, three of which survive at the present day:
 Theravāda, in Southeast Asia and South Asia;
 Dharmaguptaka, in China, Korea and Vietnam;
 Mūlasarvāstivāda, in the Tibetan tradition;

In Christianity

While the historical usage of the term "sect" in Christendom has had pejorative connotations, referring to a group or movement with heretical beliefs or practices that deviate from those of groups considered orthodox, its primary meaning is to indicate a community which has separated itself from the larger body from which its members came.

Orthodox

Roman Catholic sects

There are many groups outside the Roman Catholic Church which regard themselves as Catholic, such as the Community of the Lady of All Nations, the Palmarian Catholic Church, the Philippine Independent Church, the Brazilian Catholic Apostolic Church, the Movement for the Restoration of the Ten Commandments of God, Most Holy Family Monastery, the Society of Saint Pius X, and others.

Protestant sects

In Hinduism

The Indologist Axel Michaels writes in his book about Hinduism that in an Indian context the word "sect does not denote a split or excluded community, but rather an organized tradition, usually established by founder with ascetic practices." According to Michaels, "Indian sects do not focus on heresy, since the lack of a center or a compulsory center makes this impossible – instead, the focus is on adherents and followers."

In Islam

Islam was classically divided into two major sects, known as Sunni Islam and Shia Islam. Kharijite and Murijite Islam were two early Islamic sects. Each sect developed several distinct jurisprudence systems reflecting their own understanding of the Islamic law during the course of the history of Islam.

Current sects 
Sunnis are separated into five maddhabs; Hanafi, Maliki, Shafi'i, Hanbali and Ẓāhirī. The Shia, on the other hand, first developed Kaysanism, which in turn divided into three major groupings known as Fivers, Seveners and Twelvers. The Zaydis separated first. The non-Zaydis were initially called "Rafida". The Rafidis later divided into two sub-groups known as Imamiyyah and Batiniyyah.

 The "Imami-Shi'a" later brought into existence Ja'fari jurisprudence. Akhbarism, Usulism, and Shaykhism were all ensued as variations of "Ja'fari fiqh," while Alawites and Alevis who are not the strict followers of "Ja'farism" are developed separately from the teachings of Ithna'ashari Imāms.
 Batiniyya groups, on the other hand, were divided into two sub-groups known as Seveners and Ismā'īlīs. Qarmatians who did not follow the Fatimid Caliphate were branched from the Seveners. Those groups of Batiniyya who followed the Fatimids are the ancestors of today's Ismā'īlīs. Druze was emerged as an offshoot of Ismāʿīlism at the beginning of the 11th Century. Isma'ilism at the end of the 11th Century split into two major branches known as Nizārī Ismā'īlī (Assassins of Alamut) and Musta’li Ismaili. As a result of the assassination of Fatimid Caliph Al-Amir bi-Ahkami'l-Lah, Mustaali was once more again divided into Hafizis and Taiyabi Ismailis (Dawoodis, Sulaymanis and Alavis). 
 The Hanafi, Maliki, Shafi'i and Hanbali Sunnis, the Twelver groups, the Ismā'īlī groups, the Zaydis, the Ibadis, and the Ẓāhirīs continue to exist. In addition, new sects like Black Muslim movements, Quranists, Salafis, Wahhabis, and Zikris have been emerged independently.

Former sects 
 The Khawarij were initially divided into five major branches: Sufris, Azariqa, Najdat, Adjarites and Ibadis.

Amman Message 

An Islamic convention held in Jordan in July 2005, which brought 200 Muslim scholars from over 50 countries together, announced the official recognition of eight schools of Islamic jurisprudence and the varying schools of Islamic theology. The eight recognized Islamic schools and branches are:
 Sunni Hanafi
 Sunni Maliki
 Sunni Shafi'i
 Sunni Hanbali
 Shi'i Imāmī (followers of the Ja'fari jurisprudence)
 Shi'i Zaydi
 Khariji Ibadi
 Sunni Ẓāhirī

In Jainism

See also
 Classifications of religious movements 
 Cult (religious practice)
 New religious movement
 One true church
 Religious exclusivism

References

External links

 Church sect theory by William H. Swatos, Jr . in the Encyclopedia of Religion and Society by Swatos (editor)
 Apologetics Index: research resources on cults, sects, and related issues. The publisher operates from an evangelical Christian point of view, but the site links to and presents a variety of viewpoints.
 ReligionNewsBlog.com Current news articles about religious cults, sects, and related issues.

 
Sociology of religion
Pejorative terms